The Electravia GMPE 104 is a French electric motor for powering electric aircraft, designed and produced by Electravia of Vaumeilh.

By April 2018 the engine was no longer advertised on the company website and seems to be out of production.

Design and development
The GMPE 104 is a brushed design producing , with a disk collector. It has a 93% efficiency.

Specifications (GMPE 104)

See also

References

Aircraft electric engines